The San Juan Puerto Rico Temple is a temple of the Church of Jesus Christ of Latter-day Saints (LDS Church) in San Juan, Puerto Rico.

History
The intent to construct the temple was announced by church president Russell M. Nelson on October 7, 2018, during the Sunday afternoon session of the church's general conference.
Nelson announced 11 other temples at the same time, bringing the total number of temples operating, under construction, or announced at that time to 201.

Following the release of an artist's rendering of the temple a few days earlier, on January 17, 2019, the LDS Church announced that a groundbreaking to signify beginning of construction would be held on May 4, 2019, with Walter F. González, the president of the church's Caribbean Area, assigned to preside. When that groundbreaking was subsequently held on that date, Church leaders in attendance noted that construction of the temple was anticipated to take around two years to complete.

The temple was originally planned to be completed in 2021. Delays were expected in response to the coronavirus pandemic. The temple was dedicated by D. Todd Christofferson on January 15, 2023.

See also

 The Church of Jesus Christ of Latter-day Saints in Puerto Rico
 Comparison of temples of The Church of Jesus Christ of Latter-day Saints
 List of temples of The Church of Jesus Christ of Latter-day Saints
 List of temples of The Church of Jesus Christ of Latter-day Saints by geographic region
 Temple architecture (Latter-day Saints)

References

External links
San Juan Puerto Rico Temple at ChurchofJesusChristTemples.org

Temples (LDS Church) in North America
21st-century Latter Day Saint temples
Buildings and structures in San Juan, Puerto Rico
2023 establishments in Puerto Rico
Temples (LDS Church) in the United States
Temples (LDS Church) in Latin America
Religious buildings and structures completed in 2023
Religious buildings and structures in Puerto Rico